Grace Taber Hallock (April 10, 1893 – August 17, 1967) was an American children's writer of the early to mid-20th century. Many of her books explained health and science issues, including Florence Nightingale and the Founding of Professional Nursing and Marie Curie (both published by the Metropolitan Life Insurance Co. as part of a series called Health Heroes).

She was born in 1893 on the farm that belonged to her parents, Robin W. Hallock and Isabel Taber Hallock. She lived there her whole life. She graduated from Mount Holyoke College in 1914 and afterward helped organize the suffragette organization in Ulster County, New York.

Newbery Award
Hallock was recognized with a Newbery Honor in 1929 for The Boy Who Was, published in 1928.

References

External links 

 

1893 births
1967 deaths
American children's writers
Children's non-fiction writers
Mount Holyoke College alumni
People from Ulster County, New York